Is the Holocaust Unique? Perspectives on Comparative Genocide is a 1995 book edited by Alan Rosenbaum. In the book, scholars compare the Holocaust to other well-known instances of genocide and mass death. The book asks whether there are any historical parallels to the Jewish Holocaust and whether Armenians, Gypsies, American Indians, or others have undergone a comparable genocide.

As Alan Rosenbaum stated in regards to the book: 

A second edition was printed in 2000 and a third edition was released in 2009.

Contents 
 The ethics of uniqueness by John K. Roth
 Religion and the uniqueness of the Holocaust by Richard L. Rubenstein
 From the Holocaust: some legal and moral implications by Richard J. Goldstone
 The uniqueness of the Holocaust: the historical dimension by Steven T. Katz
 Responses to the Porrajmos: the Romani Holocaust by Ian Hancock
 The Atlantic slave trade and the Holocaust: a comparative analysis by Seymour Drescher
 The Armenian genocide as precursor and prototype of twentieth-century genocide by Robert F. Melson
 The comparative aspects of the Armenian and Jewish cases of genocide: a sociohistorical perspective by Vahakn N. Dadrian
 Stalinist terror and the question of genocide: the great famine by Barbara B. Green
 The Holocaust and the Japanese atrocities by Kinue Tokudome
 Applying the lessons of the Holocaust by Shimon Samuels
 The rise and fall of metaphor: German historians and the uniqueness of the Holocaust by Wulf Kansteiner
 Uniqueness as denial: the politics of genocide scholarship by David E. Stannard

See also
 Historic recurrence
 Holocaust trivialization
 Historikerstreit

Notes

External links
  (3rd edition; 2018)

1995 non-fiction books
Holocaust
Holocaust studies